Bluntisham is a village and civil parish in Cambridgeshire, England. The population of the civil parish at the 2011 census was 2,003. Bluntisham is situated within Huntingdonshire which is a non-metropolitan district of Cambridgeshire as well as being a historic county of England.
The villages of Earith, Colne, Woodhurst, and Somersham are all close by.

The prime meridian passes through the western edge of Bluntisham.

Etymology
The village was known as Bluntersham between the 10th and 13th centuries, Blondesham in the 14th century, and Bluntysham, Bluntsome and Blunsham in the 16th century. Due to the close proximity of Bluntisham and Earith, the two formed the parish of Bluntisham-cum-Earith, with the parish church in Bluntisham and a chapelry in Earith. However, the civil parish of Bluntisham-cum-Earith was dissolved in 1948 when the two were separated.

History
There is evidence to suggest that Neolithic and Roman inhabitants once settled in Bluntisham. The manor of Bluntisham goes back to the early part of the 10th century, when it was seized by Toli the Dane, who is said to have been the jarl or alderman of Huntingdon. Toli was killed at the Battle of Tempsford in 917, at which point the county returned to the rule of Edward the Elder. Bluntisham later became the property of Wulfnoth Cild who sold it circa 970–75 to Bishop Æthelwold of Winchester and Brithnoth, the first Abbot of Ely, for the endowment of Ely Abbey. The sale was confirmed by King Edgar, but when he died in 975 a claim was made by the sons of Bogo de Hemingford, who believed that it was the inheritance of their uncle. Their claim was declared false at the county court, and the sale to Ely Abbey went ahead.

In 1085 William the Conqueror ordered that a survey should be carried out across his kingdom to discover who owned which parts and what it was worth. The survey took place in 1086 and the results were recorded in what, since the 12th century, has become known as the Domesday Book. Starting with the king himself, for each landholder within a county there is a list of their estates or manors; and, for each manor, there is a summary of the resources of the manor, the amount of annual rent that was collected by the lord of the manor both in 1066 and in 1086, together with the taxable value.

Bluntisham was listed in the Domesday Book in the Hundred of Hurstingstone in Huntingdonshire; the name of the settlement was written as Bluntesham in the Domesday Book. In 1086 there were two manors at Bluntisham; the annual rent paid to the lords of the manors in 1066 had been £5 and the rent had increased to £5.25 in 1086.

The Domesday Book does not explicitly detail the population of a place but it records that there was 16 households at Bluntisham. There is no consensus about the average size of a household at that time; estimates range from 3.5 to 5.0 people per household. Using these figures then an estimate of the population of Bluntisham in 1086 is that it was within the range of 56 and 80 people.

The Domesday Book uses a number of units of measure for areas of land that are now unfamiliar terms, such as hides and ploughlands. By 1086, the hide had become a unit of tax assessment rather than an actual land area; a hide was the amount of land that could be assessed as £1 for tax purposes. The survey records that there was 6 ploughlands at Bluntisham in 1086 and that there was the capacity for a further 2.62 ploughlands.

The tax assessment in the Domesday Book was known as geld or danegeld and was a type of land-tax based on the hide or ploughland. It was originally a way of collecting a tribute to pay off the Danes when they attacked England, and was only levied when necessary. Following the Norman Conquest, the geld was used to raise money for the King and to pay for continental wars; by 1130, the geld was being collected annually. Having determined the value of a manor's land and other assets, a tax of so many shillings and pence per pound of value would be levied on the land holder. While this was typically two shillings in the pound the amount did vary; for example, in 1084 it was as high as six shillings in the pound.  For the manors at Bluntisham the total tax assessed was seven geld.

By 1086 there was already a church and a priest at Bluntisham.

Bluntisham remained under ownership of the Bishop of Ely until the dissolution of the monasteries, when it was granted to the dean and chapter of Ely. Valentine Walton was appointed governor of Ely in 1649 for his services to Oliver Cromwell's Parliament. Upon the Restoration, it was restored to the dean and chapter. In 1869, it was taken over by the Ecclesiastical Commissioners, who remain lords of the manor.

The village was built up around four fields. The north-western part of the parish contains Higham Field, with Gull Field (named for the gills which slope towards the Great Ouse) to the south-west. Colneway Field lay to the north-east of Higham Field, with Old Mill (or "Inhams") Field located between Colneway and Bury Fen, stretching to Earith. A large wood known as "Bluntisham Hangar" once existed south of Highams Field, and is probably that mentioned in the Domesday Book. In 1341 the wood was recorded as the boundary of the Bishop of Ely's right of hunting.

Government
As a civil parish, Bluntisham has a parish council. The parish council is elected by the residents of the parish who have registered on the electoral roll; the parish council is the lowest tier of government in England. A parish council is responsible for providing and maintaining a variety of local services including allotments and a cemetery; grass cutting and tree planting within public open spaces such as a village green or playing fields. The parish council reviews all planning applications that might affect the parish and makes recommendations to Huntingdonshire District Council, which is the local planning authority for the parish. The parish council also represents the views of the parish on issues such as local transport, policing and the environment. The parish council raises its own tax to pay for these services, known as the parish precept, which is collected as part of the Council Tax.  Bluntisham parish council has eleven members and normally meets on the first Monday of every month in the village hall.

Bluntisham was in the historic and administrative county of Huntingdonshire until 1965. From 1965, the village was part of the new administrative county of Huntingdon and Peterborough. Then in 1974, following the Local Government Act 1972, Bluntisham became a part of the county of Cambridgeshire.

The second tier of local government is Huntingdonshire District Council which is a non-metropolitan district of Cambridgeshire and has its headquarters in Huntingdon. Huntingdonshire District Council has 52 councillors representing 29 district wards. Huntingdonshire District Council collects the council tax, and provides services such as building regulations, local planning, environmental health, leisure and tourism. Bluntisham is a part of the district ward of Earith  and is represented on the district council by two councillors. District councillors serve for four-year terms following elections to Huntingdonshire District Council.

For Bluntisham the highest tier of local government is Cambridgeshire County Council which has administration buildings in Cambridge. The county council provides county-wide services such as major road infrastructure, fire and rescue, education, social services, libraries and heritage services. Cambridgeshire County Council consists of 69 councillors representing 60 electoral divisions. Bluntisham is a part of the electoral division of Somersham and Earith and is represented on the county council by one councillor. County councillors serve for four-year terms following elections to Cambridgeshire County Council.

At Westminster, Bluntisham is in the parliamentary constituency of North West Cambridgeshire and elects one Member of Parliament (MP) by the first past the post system of election. Bluntisham is represented in the House of Commons by Shailesh Vara (Conservative). Shailesh Vara has represented the constituency since 2005. The previous member of parliament was Brian Mawhinney (Conservative) who represented the constituency between 1997 and 2005.

Geography
The area is low-lying and very flat. The gravel soil is used to grow fruit trees, barley and oats, while wheat is grown in the loam and clay soil. The village was once home to many orchards, and fruit farming was very profitable. Some residents still sell fruit on roadside stalls, but oilseed rape is the more popular crop nowadays. Traditionally water was derived from gravel springs, but later wells were fed by surface water. A hand water pump, now defunct, still stands on the high street. Somersham Road yielded a chalybeate spring, where more than one attempt was made in the 18th century to establish a spa. The "healing" properties of its waters were recommended by John Addenbrooke, founder of Addenbrooke's Hospital in Cambridge, among others.

Landmarks
The Old Rectory, now known as Bluntisham House, was built circa 1720, with wings added in the 18th century and further alterations in the 19th century. The doorway was taken from the Old Slepe Hall in St Ives, the former home of Oliver Cromwell. The building, once the childhood home of the writer Dorothy L. Sayers, has a Grade II* listing.

Culture and community
The parish was once home to the most successful Bandy club in British history, the Bury Fen Bandy club. From this famous club came Charles Goodman Tebbutt, who was responsible for the first published rules of Bandy in 1882. Bury Fen is still popular for ice skating when it floods and freezes over in colder winters.

The author and agricultural reformist H. Rider Haggard visited the village in 1901, while travelling through Huntingdonshire. He commented on the "very excellent dwellings", built for local agricultural workers.

The Barograph in the centre of the High Street was erected in 1911 as a memorial to some of the Tebbutt family and is kept in working order by the Bluntisham Feoffees charity.

Transport
Local buses are provided by local company Dews Coaches (route 301 to St Ives Mon-Sat, route 21 to St Ives Mon-Fri) and Vectare (route 22 to St Ives Sat).

Education
Bluntisham has its own primary school, St Helen's, which educates children aged 4–11. The school is linked to the secondary school Abbey College, in Ramsey.

Local amenities
As of December 2022, the village has the following amenities:
Village hall (hosting a variety of activities including line dancing and badminton)
Recycling centre (on Heath Road)
Petrol station
Public house
Local shop
Local gym
Fish and chip shop
Hairdresser
Local bus services
Car repair workshop
Parish church
Baptist church
Playing fields (football and cricket) 
Orchard

Religious sites

The oldest church in Bluntisham is St Mary's Church on Rectory Road. It is likely to be the church mentioned in the Domesday record for Bluntisham, however the original building no longer exists. The chapel was built in the 1330s, and the west tower from 1370 to 1380. Part of the church was rebuilt in 1450, and restoration work was carried out from 1850 to 1913. The church has eight bells, three of which date from the 1500s. The church can list its rectors back to 1217, and counts among them Henry Sayers, father of the crime novelist Dorothy L. Sayers. St Mary's is a Grade I listed building with an organ and regular bell ringing sessions.

There is also a Baptist Church on the High Street, which has existed in Bluntisham in some form since the 18th century. John Wheatley, a local carpenter, was a member of the Church and built the Meeting House and School buildings in the 19th century. In the School he placed a number of hand-carved wooden heads, thought to be likenesses of himself and his friends. He was also a teacher at the Sunday School.

Notable residents

 Crime writer Dorothy L. Sayers lived in the village from 1897, when her father became the rector, to 1917. Her novel The Nine Tailors was inspired by her father's restoration of the Bluntisham church bells in 1910.
 Sir Jervoise Athelstane Baines, an administrator in the Indian Civil Service who headed the 1891 Census of India, was born on 17 October 1847 in the village.
 John Wheatley, a carpenter and astronomer, was born in Earith in 1812 and moved to Bluntisham in 1827. He sent a carved wooden model of a farmstead to The Great Exhibition in 1851 and was awarded a silver medal. A residential street in Bluntisham, Wheatley Crescent, is named after him.
 Speed skater and bandy player Charles Goodman Tebbutt came from Bluntisham. He was responsible for writing most of the modern bandy rules.
 Jazz musician Chris Barber currently resides in Bluntisham.
 British artist Annemarie Wright moved to Bluntisham when she was eight years old. Wright now resides in Birmingham.
 Muse lead singer and guitarist Matthew Bellamy lived in the village for a short period in his childhood before moving to Teignmouth.
 Actresses and musicians Siobhan O'Neill, Aislinn O'Neill and Ceara O'Neill currently reside in the village. 
 Musician Terry Reid grew up in the village.

References

External links

Bluntisham Parish Website
Bluntisham.info
Bluntisham Baptist Church History pages
Local bus times

Villages in Cambridgeshire
Huntingdonshire
Civil parishes in Cambridgeshire